Patrick Chamoiseau (born 3 December 1953) is a French author from Martinique known for his work in the créolité movement. His work spans a variety of forms and genres, including novels, essays, children's books, screenplays, theatre and comics. His novel Texaco was awarded the Prix Goncourt in 1992.

Biography
Chamoiseau was born on 3 December 1953 in Fort-de-France, Martinique, where he resides. After he studied law in Paris, he returned to Martinique, inspired by Édouard Glissant to take a close interest in Creole culture.

In 1981, he was the co-author, with Georges Puisy, of a historical work on the Antilles under the reign of Napoléon Bonaparte, Delgrès : les Antilles sous Bonaparte. In 1989, he was the co-author of Éloge de la créolité (In Praise of Creoleness) with Jean Bernabé and Raphaël Confiant.

Chamoiseau has received several awards. In 1990, he received the Prix Carbet for Antan d'enfance, the first book in an autobiographical trilogy collectively titled Une enfance créole. His 1992 novel Texaco has been described as "a masterpiece, the work of a genius, a novel that deserves to be known as much as Fanon's The Wretched of the Earth and Cesaire's Return to My Native Land." In 1999, Chamoiseau was honoured with a Prince Claus Award for his contribution to Caribbean society.

Chamoiseau's writing style has sometimes been compared to that of Louis-Ferdinand Céline, for how they explore the relationship between the written and the oral.

Writing style and approach

Masculinity versus femininity 
The dynamics and relationship between men and women have been a long-time subject of literature in the Caribbean. The concept of "masculinity" versus "femininity" is a literary theme indicative of Caribbean literature. Patrick Chamoiseau, like many other authors from the Caribbean, uses this theme in many of his literary works. However, as there are a larger number of male writers that come out of the Caribbean, this topic of conversation is primarily male driven and takes the "masculinist" perspective.

Chamoiseau has often been criticized as a somewhat patriarchal literary figure after having founded the masculinist Créolité movement in the Antilles archipelago. The founding of this movement was intended to bring pride and nationalism to the male Antillean population that had been emasculated for centuries by being barred from holding positions of power and authority by their European colonizers. The practice of slavery can be argued to have had a more detrimental effect on the male slave population than on the female slave population, as white slave owners attempting to have sexual affairs with female slaves would often offer them more privileges compared to their male counterparts. 

However, his literary work in the children's story "Kosto et ses deux enfants" (from Émerveilles) is in stark contrast to his typical patriarchal and masculine nature. The representation of men in Caribbean literature is typically portrayed in a negative light; in the story, this theme is contrasted by the main male character becoming an upstanding and respectable father figure.

Créolité 
A question that many writers from the Caribbean try to answer is: "What does it mean to be Caribbean?" This question is the subject of a search for identity, and the word that Chamoiseau and his colleagues used to answer this question is "Creoleness". Creoleness refers to how different cultures adapt and blend on islands or isolated areas, which in the case of the Caribbean, refers to the blending of African, Polynesian, and Asian cultures with that of their European colonizers. This idea of Creoleness contrasts the idea of "Americanness" in that it existed prior to America, and that "Americanness" excludes it interaction with the indigenous population. 

This relates to Patrick Chamoiseau's writing style in that his choices are purposeful as his overall goal is to express this concept of Creoleness. Creole Folktales is a prime example from his works. The collection itself takes place around the 17th century in the French Antilles and Chamoiseau casts storyteller-narrator and uses creole in order to recreate the tradition of storytelling in the Antilles that was primarily oral. Chamoiseau chooses these aspects to add to his writings as oral and historical accuracy are important in the representation of the Antilles and are crucial in bring awareness to Creoleness.

Bibliography
Novels

 Chronique des sept misères (1986). Translated by Linda Coverdale as Chronicle of the Seven Sorrows (University of Nebraska Press, 1999).
 Solibo magnifique (1988). Translated by Rose-Myriam Réjouis and Val Vinokurov as Solibo Magnificent (Pantheon, 1998; Granta, 1999).
Texaco (1992). Translated by Rose-Myriam Réjouis and Val Vinokurov (Pantheon/Granta, 1997).
L'Esclave vieil homme et le Molosse (1997). Translated by Linda Coverdale under the titles Slave Old Man (The New Press, 2018) and The Old Slave and the Mastiff (Dialogue Books, 2018).
Biblique des derniers gestes (2002).
Un dimanche au cachot (2008). 
 Les Neuf consciences du malfini (2009).
 L'Empreinte à Crusoé (2012).
 Hypérion victimaire : Martiniquais épouvantable (2013). Republished as J'ai toujours aimé la nuit (2017).
 La Matière de l'absence (2016).

Autobiography

 Antan d'enfance (1990). Translated by Carol Volk as Childhood (University of Nebraska Press/Granta, 1999).
 Chemin d'école (1994). Translated by Linda Coverdale as School Days (University of Nebraska Press, 1997; Granta, 1998).
 À bout d'enfance (2005).

Essays

Éloge de la créolité (1989). With Jean Bernabé et Raphaël Confiant.
Martinique (1989). Photographs by Michel Renaudeau and Emmanuel Valentin.
Lettres créoles : tracées antillaises et continentales de la littérature : Haiti, Guadeloupe, Martinique, Guyane : 1635-1975 (1991). With Raphaël Confiant
Guyane : traces-mémoires du bagne (1994). Photographs by Rodolphe Hammadi.
Ecrire en pays dominé (1997).
Frères migrants (2017). Translated by Matthew Amos and Fredrik Rönnbäck as Migrant Brothers (Yale University Press, 2018).

Other

 Delgrès : les Antilles sous Bonaparte (1981). With Georges Puisy and illustrated by Georges Puisy.
Manman Dlo contre la fée Carabosse (1982).
 Au temps de l'antan : contes du pays Martinique (1989). Translated by Linda Coverdale under the titles Creole Folktales (The New Press, 1994) and Strange Words (Granta, 1998).
 Elmire des sept bonheurs (1998). Translated by Mark Polizzotti as Seven Dreams of Elmira (Zoland Books, 1999). Photographs by Jean-Luc de Laguarigue.
 Le Papillon et la Lumière (2013). Illustrated by Ianna Andreadis.

Screenplays

L'Exil du roi Behanzin (1994). Directed by Guy Deslauriers.
Le Passage du Milieu (2000). Directed by Guy Deslauriers.
Biguine (2004). Directed by Guy Deslauriers.
Nord Plage (2004). Directed by José Hayot.
Aliker (2009). Directed by Guy Deslauriers.

Comics

 "Monsieur Coutcha" by Tony Delsham. Monthly comic that started in 1972, illustrated by Chamoiseau under the pseudonym "Abel". Compiled and published as Le retour de Monsieur Coutcha (1984).
 Encyclomerveille d'un tueur #1 : L'orphelin de Cocoyer Grands-Boi (2009). Illustrated by Thierry Ségur.

Children's literature

Émerveilles (1998).

Honors and awards 

 1986: Prix Kléber Haedens, for Chronique des sept misères
 1986: Prix de l'île Maurice, for Chronique des sept misères
 1987: Prix international francophone Loys Masson, for Chronique des sept misères
 1988: Grand Prix de la littérature de jeunesse, for Au temps de l’antan
 1989: "Mention" Premio Grafico Fiera di Bologna per la Gioventù de la Foire du livre de jeunesse de Bologne (Italie) for Au temps de l'antan : contes du pays Martinique
 1990: Prix Carbet de la Caraïbe, for Antan d'enfance
 1992: Prix Goncourt for Texaco
 1999: Prince Claus Award
 2002: Prix Spécial du Jury RFO, for Biblique des derniers gestes
 2008: Prix du Livre RFO, for Un dimanche au cachot
 2010: Commandeur des Arts et des Lettres
 2016: Prix international Nessim Habif, for La Matière de l'absence
 2019: Best Translated Book Award (Slave Old Man)

Further reading 
 Wendy Knepper, Patrick Chamoiseau: A Critical Introduction (2012): 
 Rose Réjouis, "Object Lessons: Metaphors of Agency in Walter Benjamin's "The Task of the Translator" and Patrick Chamoiseau's SOLIBO MAGNIFIQUE" (See Academia.edu)

See also 

 Caribbean literature
 Postcolonial literature

References

External links 
Patrick Chamoiseau, biography, bibliography, interview, and links, "île en île", City University of New York, 2002–2003. 
Critical bibliography (Auteurs.contemporain.info) 

1953 births
Living people
People from Fort-de-France
Martiniquais writers
French people of Martiniquais descent
Prix Goncourt winners
French male writers
20th-century French novelists
Créolité